Cable Ties are a punk rock band from Melbourne, Australia formed in 2015. 

Guitarist and singer Jenny McKechnie moved to Melbourne from Bendigo with a background in folk music, and was introduced to the city's burgeoning punk music scene by a friend, Grace Kindellan, who formed a band (Wet Lips) with McKechnie on bass guitar. McKechnie joined bassist Nick Brown and drummer Shauna Boyle to form Cable Ties in 2015, with the band naming itself after cable ties in reference to the band's "very physical but functional" sound. They played their earliest gigs at The Tote Hotel in Collingwood and The Old Bar in Fitzroy, and their first album, the self-titled Cable Ties was released in May 2017.

The band is signed to Melbourne independent record label Poison City Records. Their second album, Far Enough, was released internationally on American label Merge Records in March 2020.

Discography

Albums

Awards and nominations

Music Victoria Awards
The Music Victoria Awards, are an annual awards night celebrating Victorian music. They commenced in 2005.

! 
|-
| rowspan="5"| 2017
| Cable Ties
| Best Album
| 
| rowspan="5"| 
|-
| "Say What You Mean"
| Best Song
| 
|-
| rowspan="3"|  Cable Ties
| Best Band
| 
|-
| Best Emerging Artist
| 
|-
| Best Live Act
| 
|-
| 2018
| Cable Ties
| Best Live Act
| 
| rowspan="5"|
|-
| rowspan="4"| 2020
| rowspan="2"| Far Enough
| Best Victorian Album
| 
|-
| Best Rock/Punk Album
| 
|-
| rowspan="2"| Cable Ties
| Best Band
| 
|-
| Best Live Act
| 
|-

References

External links

Musical groups established in 2015
Australian indie rock groups
Musical groups from Melbourne